The Power County Courthouse, at 543 Bannock Ave. in American Falls, Idaho is a historic building that includes Classical Revival and Prairie School architecture.  It was a work of architect C. A. Sundberg and was built in 1925.

It was listed on the National Register of Historic Places in 1987.

According to a 1987 review, this courthouse and the Teton County Courthouse are the only two courthouses in Idaho whose architecture shows Prairie School influence.

References 

Courthouses on the National Register of Historic Places in Idaho
Neoclassical architecture in Idaho
Prairie School architecture in Idaho
Government buildings completed in 1925
Power County, Idaho
National Register of Historic Places in Power County, Idaho